Blood Red, Sister Rose (1974) is a novel by Australian writer Thomas Keneally.

Story outline
The novel is loosely based on the life of Joan of Arc. It concentrates mainly on the events surrounding the Maid's lifting of the siege of Orleans, and the real reason behind her "voices". Shockingly, it paints her as a lesbian, which was the real reason she was burned at the stake.

Critical reception
Kirkus Reviews noted about the novel: "This is probably Keneally's magnum opus, but like other culminating masterpieces its fictional components have been foreshadowed in his earlier, more modest novels. Again Keneally examines the predicament of the wise fools of this world, the forthright blunderers who, unlike the Establishment, take account of the realities of human suffering and cosmic bewilderment."

Veronica Brady, in her essay reviewing a number of Keneally novels noted that the author's Joan is "an Australian version of the French heroine, and her predicament reflects a tension central to a culture in which relationships to history on the one hand and to the environment on the other remain ambivalent."

See also
 1974 in Australian literature

Notes
 Dedication: To my dear daughters Margaret and Jane.
 Keneally has noted that his interest in Joan of Arc was kindled by a meeting with Germaine Greer: "When she returned to Australia she was beset by questions. The continual question she was asked was: 'Why don't you let normal people get on with their lives?' The night I met her I noticed there was a frantic response in her to the standard question, as if she was fighting for breath, as if she was sick of the role that she and the media and various other people had imposed on her and I can see therefore that at the heart of being a Messiah or a revolutionary there is a great yearning to take off your clothes and be a normal person."

References

Novels by Thomas Keneally
1974 Australian novels